Krishna Janmashtami , also known simply as Krishnashtami, Janmashtami, or Gokulashtami, is an annual Hindu festival that celebrates the birth of Krishna, the eighth avatar of Vishnu. According to the Hindu lunisolar calendar, it is observed on the eighth tithi (Ashtami) of the Krishna Paksha (dark fortnight) of Shraavana Masa (according to the amanta tradition) or Bhadrapada Masa (according to the purnimanta tradition). This overlaps with August or September of the Gregorian calendar.

It is an important festival, particularly in the Vaishnavism tradition of Hinduism. Dance-drama enactments of the life of Krishna according to the Bhagavata Purana (such as Rasa Lila or Krishna Lila), devotional singing through the midnight when Krishna was born, fasting (upavasa), a night vigil (Ratri Jagaran), and a festival (Mahotsav) on the following day are a part of the Janmashtami celebrations. It is celebrated particularly in Mathura and Vrindavan, along with major Vaishnava and non-sectarian communities found in Manipur, Assam, Bihar, West Bengal, Odisha, Madhya Pradesh, Rajasthan, Gujarat, Maharashtra, Karnataka, Kerala, Andhra Pradesh, Tamil Nadu and all the other states of India.

Krishna Janmashtami is followed by the festival Nandotsava, which celebrates the occasion when Nanda distributed gifts to the community in honor of the birth.

Significance

Krishna was Devaki and Vasudeva Anakadundubhi's son, and his birthday is celebrated by Hindus as Janmashtami, particularly those of the Gaudiya Vaishnavite tradition, as he is considered the supreme personality of the Godhead. Janmashtami is celebrated when Krishna is believed to have been born according to Hindu tradition, which was in Mathura at midnight on the eighth day of Bhadrapada or the 23rd day of Shraavana, which overlaps with late August and early September in the Gregorian calendar.

Krishna was born in an area of chaos. It was a time when persecution was rampant, freedoms were denied, evil was everywhere, and when there was a threat to his life by his uncle, King Kansa. Immediately following the birth of Krishna at Mathura, his father Vasudeva Anakadundubhi took him across the Yamuna river to foster parents in Gokula named Nanda and Yashoda, who were Vasudeva's brother and sister-in-law. Along with Krishna, an avatar of the serpent Shesha was also incarnated on earth as Krishna's older brother Balarama, who was the son of Rohini, Vasudeva's first wife. This legend is celebrated on Janmashtami by people keeping fasts, singing devotional songs of love for Krishna, and keeping a vigil into the night. After Krishna's midnight hour birth, forms of baby Krishna are bathed and clothed, then placed in a cradle. The devotees then break their fast by sharing food and sweets. Women draw tiny footprints outside their house doors and kitchen, walking towards their house, a symbolism for Krishna's journey into their homes.

Celebrations

Hindus celebrate Janmashtami by fasting, singing, praying together, preparing and sharing special food, night vigils, and visiting Krishna or Vishnu temples. Major Krishna temples organize recitation of Bhagavata Purana and Bhagavad Gita. Many northern Indian communities organize dance-drama events called Rasa Lila or Krishna Lila. The tradition of Rasa Lila is particularly popular in the Mathura region, in northeastern states of India such as Manipur and Assam, and in parts of Rajasthan and Gujarat. It is acted out by numerous teams of amateur artists, cheered on by their local communities, and these drama-dance plays begin a few days before each Janmashtami. People decorate their houses with flowers and light. On this day, People chant "Hare Krishna hare Krishna, Krishna- Krishna Hare Hare". The Janmashtami celebration is followed by Dahi Handi, which is celebrated the next day.

Jammu Region 
In Jammu region, Janamashtami is popularly known by the name "Thogre/Thakure da Vrat" (meaning Vrat dedicated to Thakur i.e. Shri Krishna). Observing a Phalaahari Vrat for complete one day is the major ritual in the festival. The day is marked by numerous Phalaahari Dhaams or Bhandaras in the streets of Jammu region's prominent towns. 

Young boys celebrate Janamashtami by flying kites in the sky. Often Shri Krishna themed kites are flown in the sky by kids. Janamashtami marks the beginning of kite flying season in the Jammu region. While on other hand, Girls and women decorate their palms by applying Teera, dye of an indigenous plant.

Another ceremony associated with Janamashtami in Jammu region is Deyaa Parna' in which Dogras donate cereal grains in the name of their ancestors & Kuldevtas. A holy tree called Jand is worshipped by women on this day. Special Rotis called Draupads are prepared and offered to cows & deities. 

During evening, devotees start assembling at Mandirs for Bhajan Kirtan & processions. Many people dress their children/infant as Bal Gopaal. At midnight Shri Krishna Janam is celebrated. Abhishek ceremony of Bal Gopaal is performed and Bhog of Sund Panjiri, Makkhan Mishri & Panchmeva is offered to Bal Gopaal ji.

 Kashmir 
Janamashtami is celebrated as Zaram Satam (Janam Saptami) by the native Kashmiri Pandits of Kashmir. The festival is associated with observing a Vrat whole day and visiting Thokur Kuth''' (Krishna Mandir) at midnight. At Night, Puja is performed in the temples which includes Abhishek to Krishna Murti & Bhajan singing. Phalaahari food items like Gaer or Singhada Lapsi (made from waterchestnut flour), fruits, dried fruits are consumed on this day.

Maharashtra

Janmashtami (popularly known as "Gokulashtami" as in Maharashtra) is celebrated in cities such as Mumbai, Latur, Nagpur and Pune. Dahi Handi is celebrated every August/September, the day after Krishna Janmashtami. Here, people break the Dahi Handi which is a part of this festival. The term Dahi Handi literally means "earthen pot of yogurt". The festival gets this popular regional name from the legend of baby Krishna. According to it, he would seek and steal milk products such as yogurt and butter and people would hide their supplies high up out of the baby's reach. Krishna would try all sorts of creative ideas in his pursuit, such as making human pyramids with his friends to break these high hanging pots. This story is the theme of numerous reliefs on Hindu temples across India, as well as literature and dance-drama repertoire, symbolizing the joyful innocence of children, that love and life's play is the manifestation of god.

In Maharashtra and other western states in India, this Krishna legend is played out as a community tradition on Janmashtami, where pots of yoghurt are hung high up, sometimes with tall poles or from ropes hanging from the second or third level of a building. Per the annual tradition, teams of youth and boys called the "Govindas" go around to these hanging pots, climb one over another and form a human pyramid, then break the pot. Girls surround these boys, cheer and tease them while dancing and singing. The spilled contents are considered as Prasada (celebratory offering). It is a public spectacle, cheered and welcomed as a community event.

In contemporary times, many Indian cities celebrate this annual Hindu ritual. Youth groups form Govinda pathaks, which compete with each other, especially for prize money on Janamashtami. These groups are called mandals or handis and they go around the local areas, attempting to break as many pots as possible every August. Social celebrities and media attend the festivities, while corporations sponsor parts of the event. Cash and gifts are offered for Govinda teams, and according to The Times of India, in 2014 over 4,000 handis in Mumbai alone were high hung with prizes, and numerous Govinda teams participated.

Gujarat and Rajasthan

People in Dwarka in Gujarat – where Krishna is believed to have established his kingdom – celebrate the festival with a tradition similar to Dahi Handi, called Makhan Handi (pot with freshly churned butter). Others perform folk dances at temples, sing bhajans, visit the Krishna temples such as at the Dwarkadhish Temple or Nathdwara. In the Kutch district region, farmers decorate their bullock carts and take out Krishna processions, with group singing and dancing.

The carnival-style and playful poetry and works of Dayaram, a scholar of the Pushtimarg of Vaishnavism, is particularly popular during Janmashtami in Gujarat and Rajasthan.

South India
Gokula Ashtami (Janmashtami or Sri Krishna Jayanti) celebrates the birthday of Krishna. Gokulashtami is celebrated with great fervor in South India.

In Kerala, people celebrate in September, according to the Malayalam calendar.

In Tamil Nadu, people decorate the floor with kolams (decorative pattern drawn with rice batter). Geetha Govindam and other such devotional songs are sung in praise of Krishna. The footprints of the infant Krishna from the threshold of the house till the pooja room, which depicts the arrival of Krishna into the house. A recitation of Bhagavad Gita is also a popular practice. The offerings made to Krishna include fruits, betel and butter. Savories believed to be Krishna's favorites are prepared with great care. The most important of them are seedai, sweet seedai, verkadalai urundai. The festival is celebrated in the evening as Krishna was born at midnight. Most people observe a strict fast on this day and eat only after the midnight puja.

In Andhra Pradesh, recitation of shlokas and devotional songs are the characteristics of this festival. Another unique feature of this festival is that young boys are dress up as Krishna and they visit neighbours and friends. Different varieties of fruits and sweets are first offered to Krishna and after the puja, these sweets are distributed among the visitors. The people of Andhra Pradesh observe a fast too. Various kinds of sweets are made to offer Gokula Nandan on this day. Eatables along with milk and curd are prepared to make offerings to Krishna. Joyful chanting of Krishna's name takes place in quite a few temples of the state. The number of temples dedicated to Krishna are few. The reason being that people have taken to worship him through paintings and not idols.

Popular south Indian temples dedicated to Krishna are Rajagopalaswamy Temple in Mannargudi in the Tiruvarur district, Pandavadhoothar temple in Kanchipuram, Sri Krishna temple at Udupi, and the Krishna temple at Guruvayur are dedicated to the memory of Vishnu's incarnation as Krishna. Legend says that the Sree Krishna Idol installed in Guruvayur is from Dwarka which is believed to be submerged in the sea. Varagur sri venkatesa perumal temple tanjore district of Tamil Nadu

Northern India

Janmashtami is the largest festival in the Braj region of north India, in cities such as Mathura where Hindu tradition states Krishna was born, and in Vrindavan where he grew up. Vaishnava communities in these cities in Uttar Pradesh, as well as others in the state, as well as locations in Rajasthan, Delhi, Haryana, Uttarakhand and Himalayan north celebrate Janmashtami. Krishna temples are decorated and lighted up, they attract numerous visitors on the day, while Krishna devotees hold bhakti events and keep night vigil.

The festival typically falls as the monsoons in north India have begun retreating, fields laden with crops and rural communities have time to play. In the northern states, Janmashtami is celebrated with the Raslila tradition, which literally means "play (Lila) of delight, essence (Rasa)". This is expressed as solo or group dance and drama events at Janmashtami, wherein Krishna related compositions are sung, music accompanies the performance, while actors and audience share and celebrate the performance by clapping hands to mark the beat. The childhood pranks of Krishna and the love affairs of Radha-Krishna are particularly popular. According to Christian Roy and other scholars, these Radha-Krishna love stories are Hindu symbolism for the longing and love of the human soul for the divine principle and reality it calls Brahman.

In Jammu, kite flying from rooftops is a part of the celebration on Krishna Janmashtami.

Eastern and Northeastern India
Janmashtami is widely celebrated by Hindu Vaishnava communities of eastern and northeastern India. The widespread tradition of celebrating Krishna in these regions is credited to the efforts and teachings of 15th and 16th century Sankardeva and Chaitanya Mahaprabhu. They developed philosophical ideas, as well as new forms of performance arts to celebrate the Hindu god Krishna such as Borgeet, Ankia Naat, Sattriya and Bhakti yoga now popular in West Bengal and Assam. Further east, Manipur people developed Manipuri dance form, a classical dance form known for its Hindu Vaishnavism themes, and which like Sattriya includes love-inspired dance drama arts of Radha-Krishna called Raslila. These dance drama arts are a part of Janmashtami tradition in these regions, and as with all classical Indian dances, their contextual roots are in the ancient Hindu Sanskrit text Natya Shastra, but with influences from the culture fusion between India and southeast Asia.

On Janmashtami, parents dress up their children as characters in the legends of Krishna, such as gopis and as Krishna. Temples and community centers are decorated with regional flowers and leaves, while groups recite or listen to the tenth chapter of Bhagavata Purana, and the Bhagavata Gita.

Janmashtami is a major festival celebrated with fasts, vigil, recitation of scriptures and Krishna prayers in Manipur. Dancers performing Raslila are a notable annual tradition during Janmashtami in Mathura and Vrindavan. Children play the Likol Sannaba game in the Meetei Vaishnava community.

The Shree Govindajee Temple and the ISKCON temples particularly mark the Janmashtami festival. Janmashtami is celebrated in Assam at homes, in community centers called Namghars (Assamese: নামঘৰ), and the temples usually though Janmashtami. According to the tradition, the devotees sing the Nam, perform pujas and sharing food and Prasada.

Odisha and West Bengal

In the eastern state of Odisha, specifically the region around Puri and in Nabadwip, West Bengal, the festival is also referred to as Sri Krishna Jayanti or simply Sri Jayanti. People celebrate Janmashtami by fasting and worship until midnight. The Bhagavata Purana'' is recited from the 10th chapter, a section dedicated to the life of Krishna. The next day is called "Nanda Ucchhaba" or the joyous celebration of Krishna's foster parents Nanda and Yashoda. Devotees keep fasting during the entire day of Janmashtami. They bring water from Ganga to bathe Radha Madhaba during their abhisheka ceremony. A grand abhisheka is performed at midnight for the small Radha Madha.

Outside India

Nepal

About eighty percent of the population of Nepal identify themselves as Hindus and celebrate Krishna Janmashtami. They observe Janmashtami by fasting until midnight. It is a national holiday in Nepal. The devotees recite the Bhagavad Gita and sing religious songs called bhajans and kirtans. The temples of Krishna are decorated. Shops, posters and houses carry Krishna motifs.

Bangladesh
Janmashtami is a national holiday in Bangladesh. On Janmashtami, a procession starts from Dhakeshwari Temple in Dhaka, the National Temple of Bangladesh, and then proceeds through the streets of Old Dhaka. The procession dates back to 1902, but was stopped in 1948. The procession was resumed in 1989.

Fiji
At least a quarter of the population in Fiji practices Hinduism, and this holiday has been celebrated in Fiji since the first Indian indentured laborers landed there. Janmashtami in Fiji is known as "Krishna Ashtami". Most Hindus in Fiji have ancestors that originated from Uttar Pradesh, Bihar, and Tamil Nadu, making this an especially important festival for them. Fiji's Janmashtami celebrations are unique in that they last for eight days, leading up to the eighth day, the day Krishna was born. During these eight days, Hindus gather at homes and at temples with their 'mandalis,' or devotional groups at evenings and night, and recite the Bhagavat Purana, sing devotional songs for Krishna, and distribute Prasadam.

Pakistan
Janmashtami is celebrated by Pakistani Hindus in the Shri Swaminarayan Mandir in Karachi with the singing of bhajans and delivering of sermons on Krishna. It is an optional holiday in Pakistan

Réunion
Among the Malbars of the French island Réunion, a syncretism of Catholicism and Hinduism can develop.
Janmashtami is considered to be the date of birth of Jesus Christ.

Mauritius
60% of the population is of Indian origins from Bihar and Uttar Pradesh, the majority of which more than 80% being hindus. This has been reinforced by Gujrati, Sindhi traders plus now with foreign IT consultants from India and workers from Sri Lanka. Krishna has been revered here since the 18th century by those indentured labourers of different castes who identified themselves as Jahazi bhais. They celebrate the festival with kirtans, and sweets. Dramas, plays, and kirtans illustrating the life of Krishna are played on television.

Others
In Arizona, United States, Governor Janet Napolitano was the first American leader to greet a message on Janmashtami, while acknowledging ISKCON. The festival is also celebrated widely by Hindus in Caribbean in the countries of Guyana, Trinidad and Tobago, Jamaica and the former British colony Fiji as well as the former Dutch colony of Suriname. Many Hindus in these countries originate from Tamil Nadu, Uttar Pradesh and Bihar; descendants of indentured immigrants from Tamil Nadu, Uttar Pradesh, Bihar, Bengal, and Orissa.

ISKCON temples worldwide celebrate Krishna Janmashtami, as well the birthday of ISKCON founder-acharya A. C. Bhaktivedanta Swami Prabhupada, which falls on the following day according to the Vaishnava calendar.

See also

 Krishna Janmasthan Temple Complex
 Radhashtami
 Jai Shri Krishna
 Vesak
 Bhadrapad
 Radha Krishna

References

Citations

Bibliography

Further reading

External links 
 

August observances
September observances
Hindu festivals in India
Religious festivals in India
Hindu festivals
Hindu holy days
Public holidays in Nepal
Hindu festivals in Nepal
Krishna
Vaishnavism
Human towers
Birthdays
Religious festivals in Bangladesh
Religious festivals in Pakistan
Religious festivals in Fiji
Religious festivals in the United States
Religious festivals in Guyana
Religious festivals in Trinidad and Tobago
Religious festivals in Jamaica
Religious festivals in Suriname
Festivals in Assam